Group Captain F. W. K. Klutse was a Ghanaian airman who served in the Ghana Air Force. He was the Chief of Air Staff of the Ghana Air Force from June 1979 to December 1979.

References

Ghanaian military personnel
Chiefs of Air Staff (Ghana)
Ghana Air Force personnel